Brachaluteres is a genus of filefish of the family Monacanthidae. The genus name "Brachaluteres" is derived from the Greek brachys (meaning "short") and the Latin luteus (meaning "yellow"). Fish of the genus occur in the tropical waters of the Western Pacific Ocean.

Species
There are currently 4 recognized species in this genus:
 Brachaluteres fahaqa E. Clark & Gohar, 1953
 Brachaluteres jacksonianus Quoy & Gaimard, 1824 (Pygmy leatherjacket)
 Brachaluteres taylori Woods, 1966 (Taylor's inflator filefish)
 Brachaluteres ulvarum D. S. Jordan & Fowler, 1902 (Japanese inflator filefish)

References

Monacanthidae
Fish of Oceania
Marine fish genera
Taxa named by Pieter Bleeker